Edmond Agius (born 23 February 1987) is Maltese professional footballer currently playing for the Maltese Premier League side Sliema Wanderers, where he plays as a midfielder.

Playing career

Hiberians
A product of the Hibernians Youth Nursery, Edmond made his debut in the Premier League in season 2005.

Valletta
Edmond Agius joined Valletta in June 2008.

Birkirkara
Edmond Aguis joined Birkirkara in June 2014.

Honours

Hibernians
Winner
 2008–09 Maltese Premier League
 2007 Maltese Cup
 2007–08 Maltese Super Cup

Valletta
Winner
 2010–11 Maltese Super Cup
 2010–11, 2013–14 Maltese Premier League
 2011–12 Maltese Super Cup

Birkirkara
Winner
 2014–15 Maltese Cup

External links

1987 births
Living people
Maltese footballers
Malta international footballers
Hibernians F.C. players
Valletta F.C. players
Birkirkara F.C. players
Maltese Premier League players
Competitors at the 2005 Mediterranean Games
Association football midfielders
Mediterranean Games competitors for Malta